The Danny Thiel Track was an outdoor track and field facility that was part of the George G. Westfeldt Practice and Competition Complex located on the campus of Tulane University in New Orleans, Louisiana. The track hosted home meets and was the practice facility for the Tulane Green Wave men's and women's track and field teams. The stadium had a seating capacity of 1,200.  

The track, which had a fully lit grandstand, hosted events and a number of track meets featuring teams from around the Gulf South. The adjacent Barney Mintz Auxiliary Field was also used for track and field events. In 2001, a new track was installed. The track and majority of the Westfeldt Practice and Competition Complex was demolished to build Yulman Stadium.

See also
Tulane Green Wave

References

Athletics (track and field) venues in New Orleans
College track and field venues in the United States
Defunct athletics (track and field) venues in the United States
Defunct sports venues in New Orleans
Demolished sports venues in Louisiana
Tulane Green Wave sports venues